Josephine Dianne Edwards (18 August 1942 – 25 May 1985) was an Australian mathematician and mathematics educator who founded the Australian Mathematics Competition.

Education and career
Edwards was born in Oxford and was educated at the Ursuline School in Brentwood. She went on to study mathematics at the University of Cambridge. In 1964, Edwards moved to Canberra. She taught mathematics at secondary schools in the Australian Capital Territory. In 1979, she joined the faculty at the College of Advanced Education in Canberra, later the University of Canberra.

Service
For eighteen years, Edwards was a member of the Canberra Mathematical Association, also serving as its vice-president, president and secretary.

She helped establish and run the Australian Mathematics Competition, serving as chair of its founding committee, as a member of its board of governors from 1977 to 1985 and as editor for its publications from 1979. She was also an associate editor for the American publication The College Mathematics Journal. Her articles on teaching mathematics appeared in journals in Australia, Canada and France.

Personal life
She was married to Paul Frost whom she met whilst studying mathematics at the University of Cambridge and the couple migrated to Australia and had two children. After Paul died she married Robert A. Edwards and had a daughter. Later she married John Pulley who at the time had three children from his first marriage.

Edwards died in Canberra at the age of 42.

Recognition
In 1996, Edwards was posthumously awarded a BH Neumann Award.

References 

1942 births
1985 deaths
Australian mathematicians
Australian schoolteachers
Women mathematicians
People educated at Brentwood Ursuline Convent High School
Alumni of the University of Cambridge